Sir James Allen  (10 February 1855 – 28 July 1942) was a prominent New Zealand politician and diplomat. He held a number of the most important political offices in the country, including Minister of Finance and Minister of Foreign Affairs. He was also New Zealand's Minister of Defence during World War I.

Early life
Allen was born in Adelaide, Australia. After his mother's early death, his father took him to Dunedin, New Zealand, where the family resided for several years. In either 1861 or 1862, however, Allen and his brother were given into the care of an uncle in Somerset, England. Shortly afterwards, Allen's father also died, leaving him an orphan.

Despite this rather turbulent beginning to his life, Allen made a good start. After first attending Clifton College in Bristol  (having won a scholarship to do so), he gained admittance to St John's College at Cambridge University. He graduated with a BA in 1877. Shortly afterwards, Allen decided to return to Dunedin, where he had inherited a significant amount of property from his father.

In Dunedin, Allen was highly successful, serving on the City Council and even playing for the Otago provincial rugby team. He left for England once again in 1883, studying at the Royal School of Mines for several years. When he returned to Dunedin, he established a presence in Otago's coal and gold mining industries.

Early parliamentary career

In 1887, Allen decided to enter national politics, standing in the Dunedin East seat as a conservative opponent to Robert Stout, the Premier. Few expected a first-time challenger to defeat the Premier, but amazingly, Allen did just that. Allen's own tenure as MP for Dunedin East was short, however, as he was himself voted out of office at the next (1890) election. In 1892, however, Allen returned to Parliament after winning a by-election in the rural Otago electorate of Bruce, which he held until he retired in 1920.

Gradually, Allen developed a reputation as a solid performer in Parliament. He lacked the skills at oratory of some of his contemporaries, and was often seen as humourless and uncharismatic. But he was nevertheless considered dependable, reasonable, and practical. He was sometimes cited as a possible leader for Parliament's conservative faction, but when the conservatives eventually came together to found the Reform Party, the more charismatic William Massey became leader instead.

Ministerial career
When Reform won the 1911 election, Massey became Prime Minister and Allen was elevated to Cabinet. His primary responsibilities were finance, education, and defence in the Reform Government, and he was very active in all three portfolios. As Minister of Finance, he attempted (with only a limited degree of success) to curtail the spending of the outgoing Premier, Joseph Ward, believing strongly in the need to reduce New Zealand's overseas borrowing. As Minister of Education, he was responsible for legislation that guaranteed statutory funding for universities. As Minister of Defence, he encouraged New Zealand's development of naval and air capabilities independent of the United Kingdom, and worked to improve the quality of compulsory military training. He also reversed the previous government's policy of opposing close defence co-operation with Australia.

In World War I, Allen was a major figure in New Zealand's war effort, playing a very significant organisational role. His reforms of the military training programme were widely credited with allowing a rapid deployment of New Zealand forces, including the forces which invaded and occupied Samoa (then a territory of Germany). In August 1915, a war-time coalition government was formed, and Allen lost his finance and education roles to members of the erstwhile Opposition, but he continued to play a significant role. Towards the end of the war, when both Massey (the Prime Minister) and Ward (the Leader of the Opposition) travelled overseas for meetings and conferences, Allen was Acting Prime Minister - in total, he spent nearly two years in this role. The stress of his many responsibilities during the war was considerable, and was only worsened when his son was killed in the ill-fated landing at Gallipoli. Allen was appointed an Officer of the Legion of Honour in February 1922 when he was High Commissioner in London.

Subsequent activities
After the war, the coalition government collapsed, and James Allen once again became Minister of Finance. In October 1919, he was made the first Minister of External Affairs, a new ministerial portfolio that was created to administer New Zealand's newly acquired League of Nations Mandate Samoa. He took up these posts reluctantly, describing himself as weary of politics. In 1920, he resigned from Parliament to take up a position as New Zealand's High Commissioner to the United Kingdom. He also represented New Zealand at the League of Nations, taking a prominent part in the League's Permanent Mandates Commission.

After returning to New Zealand, Allen became active in a number of organisations. Reflecting his long-held interest in the Pacific Islands, which had been stimulated by a number of visits in the course of his political career, he was a prominent member of the Institute of Pacific Relations, whose New Zealand branch he chaired from its formation in 1926 until late 1937. He was active in All Saints' Church, Dunedin and also vice-president of the Bible-in-Schools League, reflecting a cause which he had controversially championed while Minister of Education.

On 1 June 1927, Allen was appointed to the Legislative Council, the (now-abolished) upper house of Parliament. The Legislative Council was considerably more sedate than the lower house, and Allen was not overly stressed by its activities. At the end of his first term in 1934, he was reappointed (until 1941).

Allen retired from public life in 1938, and died in Dunedin on 28 July 1942.

Honours and awards
Allen was appointed a Knight Commander of the Order of the Bath in the 1917 New Year Honours, and a Knight Grand Cross of the Order of St Michael and St George in the 1926 New Year Honours. He was awarded the King George V Silver Jubilee Medal in 1935.

Notes

Further reading

 . Papers presented to Allen and other members of the New Zealand Parliamentary party.

. A paper read to the Royal Colonial Institute on 2 November 1920.

External links
Photo of James Allen addressing Returned Soldiers at Rarotonga, 1919
Image of James Allen's signature

1855 births
1942 deaths
Alumni of St John's College, Cambridge
Australian emigrants to New Zealand
Officiers of the Légion d'honneur
New Zealand recipients of the Légion d'honneur
Members of the Cabinet of New Zealand
Members of the New Zealand Legislative Council
New Zealand defence ministers
New Zealand education ministers
New Zealand MPs for South Island electorates
New Zealand finance ministers
New Zealand foreign ministers
Reform Party (New Zealand) MPs
Politicians from Adelaide
People educated at Clifton College
Permanent Representatives of New Zealand to the League of Nations
New Zealand MPs for Dunedin electorates
Burials at Dunedin Northern Cemetery
High Commissioners of New Zealand to the United Kingdom
Members of the New Zealand House of Representatives
New Zealand Knights Grand Cross of the Order of St Michael and St George
New Zealand Knights Commander of the Order of the Bath
Unsuccessful candidates in the 1890 New Zealand general election
19th-century New Zealand politicians
Dunedin City Councillors
New Zealand politicians awarded knighthoods
Chancellors of the University of Otago